The Government Civil Employees' Association was a trade union in the United Kingdom. It merged with the Transport and General Workers' Union in 1946.

See also
 List of trade unions
 Transport and General Workers' Union
 TGWU amalgamations

References
Arthur Ivor Marsh, Victoria Ryan. Historical Directory of Trade Unions, Volume 5 Ashgate Publishing, Ltd., Jan 1, 2006 pg. 436

Defunct trade unions of the United Kingdom
Civil service trade unions
Trade unions disestablished in 1946
Transport and General Workers' Union amalgamations